Mimochariesthes flaveola is a species of beetle in the family Cerambycidae, and the only species in the genus Mimochariesthes. It was described by Téocchi in 1986.

References

Tragocephalini
Beetles described in 1986